The Multi-Agency Centre (MAC) was formed in December 2001 following the Kargil intrusion and the subsequent overhaul of the Indian national security apparatus suggested by the Kargil Review Committee report and GoM report. Accordingly, the Intelligence Bureau (IB) was authorized to create a multi-agency centre (MAC) in New Delhi. Now functioning 24/7 as the nodal body for sharing intelligence inputs, MAC coordinates with representatives from numerous agencies, different ministries, both central and state. The state offices have been designated as subsidiary MACs (SMACs). In 2014 there were 374 MAC-SMAC sites across India. As noted in a 2016 parliamentary report the major contributors of intelligence inputs to the MAC were the Defence Intelligence Agency (DIA) and the Research and Analysis Wing (R&AW). Zabiuddin Ansari and Fasih Mohammed have been some of the catches by the MAC. In 2012, B Raman noted that the Indian model of the MAC had continued functioning despite being modelled after the now abandoned US CTC.

See also 

 NATGRID

References 

Indian intelligence agencies
2001 establishments in India
Government agencies established in 2001